The State Register of Heritage Places is maintained by the Heritage Council of Western Australia. , 162 places are heritage-listed in the City of Armadale, of which 13 are on the State Register of Heritage Places.

List
The Western Australian State Register of Heritage Places, lists the following 13 state registered places within the City of Armadale:

References

Armadale